Mountain Jam is an annual music festival held in upstate New York that began in 2005. It has grown to become the largest rock music and camping festival in New York. The festival was held at Hunter Mountain ski resort for fourteen years, usually in early June. In February 2019, organizers for the Festival announced that the festival was moving to the location of the original Woodstock festival, the Bethel Woods Center for the Arts.

History
Mountain Jam was originally conceived to celebrate the 25th anniversary of WDST/Radio Woodstock. More than 3,300 people attended the initial one-day event in 2005, reviews of which were overwhelmingly positive. The founder, Gary Chetkof and members of Radio Woodstock, decided to make the event annual. Over time, the festival has grown to include a diverse lineup of smaller artists, as well as large acts including Tom Petty & The Heartbreakers, Robert Plant, The Black Keys, The Lumineers, Michael Franti and Spearhead, Widespread Panic, Phil Lesh and Bob Weir,The Allman Brothers Band, Levon Helm, The Alabama Shakes, Steve Miller Band, Wilco, The Avett Brothers, Pretty Lights. Gov't Mule, the band Haynes co-founded, performed at every Mountain Jam until 2016.

Venue
Mountain Jam's three stages allow for continuous music each day. There is a Main Stage, a 2nd Stage that showcases emerging artists, and an acoustic stage that is part of smaller Greek-style amphitheater. One of the best amenities at Bethel is that every camping spot allows for a car-side parking spot, which makes camping much easier for campers.

At Hunter Mountain, The East Stage was the largest, overlooking the main terrain of the resort. Adjacent to the East Stage was the West Stage, near the resort's chair lift; and Inside the Base Lodge a third stage is set up for late night acts and musicians who require indoor amenities.
Amenities for event goers include a tent camping area in the Hunter One section of the resort and RV camping farther up the mountain. Various hotels also serve the town year-round, and the Kaatskill Mountain Club hotel and Liftside Condominiums are both within walking distance of the festival.

Some years have seen non-stop rain for almost the entire duration of the festival, while other events have had sunny and temperate weather.

In 2019, the organizers of the venue planned to switch the location of the festival from Hunter Mountain to the Bethel Woods Center for the Arts.

2005
The original Mountain Jam, a single-day event on June 4, 2005, celebrated the 25th anniversary of WDST, Woodstock's radio station. The festival featured performances by:
Gov't Mule
Medeski, Martin & Wood
Robert Randolph & The Family Band
Xavier Rudd

2006
The 2006 Mountain Jam took place June 2–4. The New York Times described it as a "little Bonnaroo".
The lineup included:

Friday Night
 DJ Logic

Saturday
 John Brown's Body
 The Trapps
 Keller Williams
 Willy Porter
 Michael Franti and Spearhead
 Shannon McNally
 Robert Randolph & the Family Band
 Benzos
 Gov't Mule
 Rose Hill Drive

Sunday
 Benevento/Russo Duo
 Joey Eppard
 Mike Gordon and Ramble Dove
 The Wood Brothers
 Medeski, Martin & Wood
 The Slip
 Grace Potter and the Nocturnals
 Gov't Mule

2007
Mountain Jam 2007 took place June 1–3 and was cited as was the largest music festival in the Northeast/New England.
.
The lineup featured:

Friday
 Gov't Mule
 RAQ
 New Orleans Social Club
 The Mercers
 Papa Mali
 The Felice Brothers

Saturday
 Gov't Mule
 Tea Leaf Green
 G. Love & Special Sauce
 New Monsoon
 Umphrey's McGee
 Earl Greyhound
 Ozomatli
 U-Melt
 Assembly of Dust
 The Warhol Crowd
 Tea Leaf Green

Sunday
 Phil Lesh and Friends, including Phil Lesh, Warren Haynes, John Molo, John Scofield and Steve Molitz
 Michael Franti and Spearhead
 North Mississippi Allstars
 Robert Randolph & the Family Band
 Backyard Tire Fire
 The Brakes
 Bret Puchir and Chicken Bucket

2008
Mountain Jam 2008 took place May 30-June 1.
The three-day lineup included:

Friday
 Ratdog
 Dark Meat
 Phonograph
 BuzzUniverse
 Giant Panda Guerrilla Dub Squad
 Pete Francis
 Jim Weider's PRoJECT PERCoLAToR with special guest Lucy Bo
 Grace Potter and the Nocturnals
 Mithic Dragons
 Ivan Neville’s Dumpstaphunk
 Umphrey's McGee
 Gov't Mule
 Galactic
 Lotus
 DJ Lady Verse

Saturday
 Sgt. Dunbar and the Hobo Banned
 Ingrid Michaelson
 O'Death
 Sharon Jones & The Dap-Kings
 JJ Grey & MOFRO
 Ray LaMontagne
 Jackie Greene
 Michael Franti & Spearhead
 Citizen Cope
 Gov't Mule
 Dark Star Orchestra
 Pnuma Trio
 DJ Lady Verse

Sunday
 Larry McCray Band
 The Felice Brothers
 Dr. Dog
 Drive-By Truckers
 Medeski, Scofield, Martin & Wood
 Levon Helm Band
 Bob Weir & Ratdog

2009
Mountain Jam 2009 took place May 29–30. The lineup included:

Friday
Gov't Mule
Umphrey's McGee
Tea Leaf Green
Railroad Earth
Girl Talk
Alberta Cross
Marco Benevento

Saturday
Gov't Mule
Coheed & Cambria
The Hold Steady
Karl Denson's Tiny Universe
Gomez
Jackie Greene
Brett Dennen
Gene Ween Band
Lee Boys
Joe Pug
John Medeski
The Movement

Sunday
The Allman Brothers Band
Michael Franti & Spearhead
The Derek Trucks Band
BK3 featuring Bill Kreutzmann
Richie Havens
Martin Sexton
The Brew
Joey Eppard

2010
Mountain Jam 2010 took place June 4 to June 6.
The lineup included:
Gov't Mule
Levon Helm & Friends- 70th Birthday Celebration w/ very special guests
Michael Franti & Spearhead
Derek Trucks & Susan Tedeschi Band
The Avett Brothers
Les Claypool
Yonder Mountain String Band
Drive-By Truckers
Matisyahu
Toots and the Maytals
Dark Star Orchestra
Grace Potter and the Nocturnals
Dr. Dog
Dave Mason
Jay Farrar (of Son Volt)
Lettuce
ALO
The Whigs
The New Mastersounds
Trombone Shorty & Orleans Avenue
Justin Townes Earle
Jerry Joseph & Wally Ingram
The Bridge
Zach Deputy
The Brew
Simone Felice
Gandalf Murphy & SCD
Van Ghost
The London Souls
These United States
Elmwood

2011
 Mountain Jam 2011 took place June 2 to June 5, with acts including:
Gov’t Mule
My Morning Jacket
Warren Haynes Band
Michael Franti & Spearhead
The Avett Brothers
Umphrey's McGee w/ John Oates
Grace Potter & the Nocturnals
Edward Sharpe & The Magnetic Zeros
Béla Fleck & The Original Flecktones
Mavis Staples
Electric Hot Tuna
Lotus
North Mississippi Allstars
Soulive
The New Deal
7 Walkers
Portugal. The Man
Preservation Hall Jazz Band
Tim Reynolds & TR3
Dawes
The London Souls
Zach Deputy
Ryan Montbleau Band
Charlie Hunter
Chris Barron
Toubab Krewe
Nicole Atkins
Carbon Leaf
Civil Twilight
The Heavy Pets
Orgone
Kung Fu
The Alternate Routes
Dangermuffin
Moon Taxi
Ari Hest
Pieta Brown
TAB the Band
Morning Teleportation
Bronze Radio Return
Nathan Moore
Bobby Long
The Big Takeover
Stephen Lynch

2012
 Mountain Jam 2012 took place May 31 to June 3, with a lineup including:
 Gov't Mule
 Steve Winwood
 Michael Franti & Spearhead
 Tedeschi Trucks Band
 The Roots
 Mariachi El Bronx
 Lukas Nelson & Promise of the Real
Also included was a brief set in tribute to Levon Helm, who was based in nearby Woodstock and had died on April 20. The set featured Gov't Mule, the Levon Helm Band, and special guests.

2013
 Mountain Jam 2013 took place June 6 to 9. The lineup included:
Phil Lesh & Friends
Widespread Panic
Gov't Mule
Primus
The Avett Brothers
The Lumineers
Dispatch
Michael Franti & Spearhead
Big Gigantic
Gary Clark Jr.
Jackie Greene
White Denim
Rubblebucket
The London Souls
The Lone Bellow
Futurebirds
David Wax Museum

2014
 The 10th Mountain Jam festival took place June 5 to 9, 2014 with the following acts: 

Thursday
 Diesel America
 K-Jamm
 The Dirty Gems
 Copious Jones
 Citizens Band Radio
 Dark Star Orchestra
 Umphrey's McGee

Friday
 Elijah & The Moon
 Antibalas
 Jack Laroux
 The Dough Rollers
 Robert Randolph
 The Weeks
 Trampled By Turtles
 Reignwolf
 The Avett Brothers
 Moon Taxi
 Bob Weir & Ratdog
 Beats Antique
 Antibalas

Saturday
 Ratboy Jr.
 Paul Green
 Connor Kennedy
 Blitzen Trapper
 Jack Laroux
 Alan Paul
 Sister Sparrow & the Dirty Birds
 Jeff Tweedy
 Jonathan Wilson
 Damian "Jr. Gong" Marley
 PGRA with Sister Sparrow & the Dirty Birds
 Valerie June
 Tedeschi Trucks Band
 Gov't Mule
 Pretty Lights
 Jackie Greene

Sunday
 Paul Green
 Ratboy Jr.
 Sean Rowe
 Anders Osborne
 Michael Franti (solo)
 Treetop Flyers
 Jay Blakesberg
 Chris Robinson Brotherhood
 Galadrielle Allman
 Ghost of a Saber Tooth Tiger
 Michael Franti & Spearhead
 Lucius
 The Allman Brothers Band

2018
The 14th Mountain Jam took place from Thursday, June 14 to Sunday, June 17, 2018 with the following acts:

Thursday
Andy Frasco & The U.N.
The Other Brothers
4 Gun Ridge
Blueberry

Friday
Sturgill Simpson
Portugal. The Man
Jenny Lewis
Rag'n'Bone Man
Turkuaz
Chicano Batman
Lewis Capaldi
Steve Gunn
Sarah Borges And The Broken Singles
Woods
Andy Frasco & The U.N.
Jocelyn and Chris Arndt
Mapache
Sweet Marie
Jane Lee Hooker
Yard Sale

Saturday
alt-J
The War on Drugs
The Decemberists
George Clinton & Parliament Funkadelic
The Record Company
Anderson East
The Felice Brothers
Alice Merton
Everything Everything
Andy Frasco & The U.N.
Thomas Wynn & The Believers
The Stone Foxes
Liz Vice
Jack Broadbent
Honeysuckle
The Other Brothers
Yard Sale
Rock Academy
Ratboy Jr.

Sunday
Jack Johnson
Father John Misty
Kurt Vile & The Violators
Mondo Cozmo
Son Little
Jade Bird
John Craigie
Eric Tessmer Band
Larkin Poe
Oliver Hazard
Sydney Worthley
Cicada Rhythm
Rock Academy
Ratboy Jr.

2019
The 15th Annual Mountain Jam took place from June 13–16 at Bethel Woods Center For The Arts At The Historic Site of the 1969 Woodstock Festival. 

Willie Nelson & Family
Gov’t Mule (2 sets)
The Avett Brothers
The Revivalists
Joe Russo’s Almost Dead (2 sets)
Dispatch
Michael Franti & Spearhead
Alison Krauss
Lukas Nelson & The Promise of the Real
Toots & The Maytals
Twiddle
Mandolin Orange
Karl Denson’s Tiny Universe
Sister Sparrow & The Dirty Birds
Amy Helm
Allman Betts Band
Marco Benevento
Andy Frasco & The U.N.
The Dustbowl Revival
The Nude Party
Tyler Ramsey
Mo Lowda & The Humble
The National Reserve
Brandon "Taz" Niederauer
Consider the Source
Mikaela Davis
Hollis Brown
Wild Adriatic
Balkun Brothers
The Big Takeover
Stephen Lewis & The Big Band of Fun
Bella’s Bartok
Sweet Marie
Michael Glabicki & Friend

2020
The 16th Annual Mountain Jam was scheduled to take place May 29-May 31, 2020 at Bethel Woods Center for the Arts. The event was canceled on March 31 due to the COVID-19 outbreak.

See also

List of jam band music festivals
List of reggae festivals

References

External links
http://www.mountainjam.com/
http://www.radiowoodstock.com/

Music festivals in New York (state)
Reggae festivals in the United States
Jam band festivals